The 2016 Rogers Cup presented by National Bank was a tennis tournament played on outdoor hard courts. It was the 127th edition (for the men) and the 114th (for the women) of the Canadian Open. The tournament was part of the ATP World Tour Masters 1000 of the 2016 ATP World Tour, and of the WTA Premier 5 tournaments of the 2016 WTA Tour, and was also a 2016 US Open Series event. The men's event was held at the Aviva Centre in Toronto, from 25 to July 31 and the women's event was held at the Uniprix Stadium in Montreal, from July 25 to July 31. The event was scheduled two weeks earlier than the usual early-August date to avoid conflicting with the 2016 Summer Olympics.

Points and prize money

Point distribution

Prize money

ATP singles main-draw entrants

Seeds

 1Rankings are as of July 18, 2016

Other entrants
The following players received wild cards into the main singles draw:
  Frank Dancevic
  Steven Diez
  Peter Polansky
  Denis Shapovalov

The following players received entry using a protected ranking into the main singles draw:
  Dmitry Tursunov

The following players received entry from the singles qualifying draw:
  Jared Donaldson
  Emilio Gómez
  Alejandro González
  Ryan Harrison
  Dennis Novikov
  Tim Smyczek
  Radek Štěpánek

Withdrawals
Before the tournament
  Marcos Baghdatis →replaced by  Vasek Pospisil 
  Roberto Bautista Agut →replaced by   Borna Ćorić
  Pablo Cuevas →replaced by   Ernests Gulbis 
  Roger Federer →replaced by  Denis Kudla
  David Ferrer →replaced by  Taylor Fritz
  Richard Gasquet →replaced by  John Millman
  Philipp Kohlschreiber →replaced by  Dudi Sela
  Feliciano López →replaced by  Mikhail Youzhny
  Andy Murray →replaced by  Ivan Dodig 
  Rafael Nadal →replaced by  Rajeev Ram 
  Albert Ramos Viñolas →replaced by  Donald Young
  Andreas Seppi →replaced by replaced by  Lu Yen-hsun 
  Gilles Simon →replaced by  Stéphane Robert 
  Janko Tipsarević →replaced by  Kyle Edmund
  Jo-Wilfried Tsonga →replaced by  Dmitry Tursunov

Retirements
  Jérémy Chardy
  Sam Querrey
  Dominic Thiem

ATP doubles main-draw entrants

Seeds

 Rankings are as of July 18, 2016

Other entrants
The following pairs received wildcards into the doubles main draw:
  Félix Auger-Aliassime /  Denis Shapovalov
  Philip Bester /  Adil Shamasdin

Retirements
  Jack Sock

WTA singles main-draw entrants

Seeds

 1 Rankings are as of July 18, 2016

Other entrants
The following players received wild cards into the main singles draw:
  Françoise Abanda
  Caroline Garcia
  Aleksandra Wozniak

The following players received entry from the singles qualifying draw:
  Kateryna Bondarenko
  Jennifer Brady
  Naomi Broady
  Mariana Duque Mariño
  Camila Giorgi
  Nao Hibino
  Vania King
  Kristína Kučová
  Alla Kudryavtseva
  Magda Linette
  Zhang Shuai
  Zheng Saisai

The following player received entry as alternate:
  Madison Brengle

The following players received entry as lucky losers:	
  Varvara Lepchenko
  Christina McHale

Withdrawals
Before the tournament
  Victoria Azarenka (pregnancy) → replaced by  Yanina Wickmayer
  Irina-Camelia Begu → replaced by  Heather Watson
  Belinda Bencic (left wrist injury) → replaced by  Daria Gavrilova
  Jelena Janković (leg strain) → replaced by  Misaki Doi
  Garbiñe Muguruza (gastrointestinal illness) → replaced by  Varvara Lepchenko
  Lesia Tsurenko (left thigh injury) → replaced by  Elena Vesnina
  CoCo Vandeweghe → replaced by  Madison Brengle
  Serena Williams (shoulder inflammation) → replaced by  Christina McHale
  Caroline Wozniacki (left elbow) → replaced by  Mirjana Lučić-Baroni

During the tournament
  Sara Errani

Retirements
  Zhang Shuai

WTA doubles main-draw entrants

Seeds

 Rankings are as of July 18, 2016

Other entrants
The following pairs received wildcards into the doubles main draw:
  Eugenie Bouchard /  Carol Zhao
  Daria Gavrilova /  Samantha Stosur
  Simona Halep /  Monica Niculescu
  Angelique Kerber /  Andrea Petkovic

The following pair received entry as alternates:
  Madison Brengle /  Tara Moore

Withdrawals
Before the tournament
  Garbiñe Muguruza

Retirements
  Chan Hao-ching

Finals

Men's singles

  Novak Djokovic defeated  Kei Nishikori, 6–3, 7–5

Women's singles

  Simona Halep defeated  Madison Keys, 7–6(7–2), 6–3

Men's doubles

  Ivan Dodig /  Marcelo Melo defeated  Jamie Murray /  Bruno Soares, 6–4, 6–4

Women's doubles

  Ekaterina Makarova /  Elena Vesnina defeated  Simona Halep /  Monica Niculescu, 6–3, 7–6(7–5)

References

External links
Official website - Men's tournament
Official website - Women's tournament

 
2016 ATP World Tour
2016 WTA Tour
2016 in Canadian tennis
2016